Preston Dalziel MacLure (July 30, 1913 – August 31, 1972) was a Canadian politician and electrician. He represented 3rd Kings in the Legislative Assembly of Prince Edward Island from 1966 to 1970 as a Progressive Conservative.

MacLure was born in 1913 in Murray Harbour North, Prince Edward Island, but resided most of his life in Montague, Prince Edward Island. He married Margaret Graham in 1936. An electrician by career, MacLure was also a cattle breeder.

MacLure entered provincial politics in the 1966 election, when he was elected councillor for the electoral district of 3rd Kings. He was defeated by Liberal Bud Ings when he ran for re-election in 1970.

MacLure died in Dundas, Prince Edward Island on August 31, 1972.

References

1913 births
1972 deaths
People from Kings County, Prince Edward Island
Progressive Conservative Party of Prince Edward Island MLAs